Sentinel Peak is located near Johnsondale, California. It is a popular with Boy Scouts visiting Camp Whitsett, with several hundred scouts hiking the mountain each week in the summer. It is in Giant Sequoia National Monument and Sequoia National Forest.

References

Mountains of the Sierra Nevada (United States)
Mountains of Tulare County, California
Sequoia National Forest
Giant Sequoia National Monument
Mountains of Northern California